Scott E. Friedman (born September 17, 1958) is an American author and attorney from Buffalo, New York. Since 2009 he has been the managing partner of the Buffalo law firm Lippes Mathias Wexler Friedman LLP. Friedman writes and speaks about the effect of positive psychology on the successful operation of family-run businesses. He is the author of seven books, five of which cover this topic.

Early life and education 
Friedman was born in Williamsville, New York. He is a graduate of Trinity College where he earned his BA. He went on to study at Washington University in St. Louis, earning his J.D. Friedman then attended the University of Pennsylvania School of Law, earning his LLM.

Career 
As a young man Friedman worked at a law firm in Philadelphia. In 2009 he became the Managing Partner of Lippes Mathias Wexler Friedman LLP in Buffalo.  His work at the firm involves helping health care businesses operate efficiently and avoid legal tangles.

Friedman has been frequently interviewed as an expert in family business planning. He has also authored several articles on the subject for state and national publications. In June 2013 he wrote a feature for Family Business Magazine, titled "A scientific field offers insights for family businesses."

Friedman serves on the board of directors of the biotech company Photolitech. In 2014 he organized the investment group Buffalo Capital Partners.

In 2015 Friedman gave a series of talks related to investment and startup companies. In 2016 he is one of several investors involved in the firm Buffalo Capital. That year he became a member of the Council for the State University of New York at Buffalo.

Books 
Friedman has written seven books drawing on his work as an attorney. He co-authored his first books related to family business with his brother Michael Friedman in 1994. The title, How to Run a Family Business, was the first of five books Friedman authored focused on advising families on how to better operate their family business. Other books in the series are The Successful Family Business<ref>"COMMUNICATION KEEPS THINGS HAPPY, HEALTHY". Craine's Chicago Business, December 06, 1997 By: Barbara B. Buchholz</ref> and Family Business and Positive Psychology''.

Honors and awards 
Friedman has received numerous awards for his professional accomplishments. He has been named to Who’s Who in America.

References

External links
Lippes Mathias Wexler Friedman LLP

1958 births
Living people
Lawyers from Buffalo, New York
People from Williamsville, New York
New York (state) lawyers
Trinity College (Connecticut) alumni
Washington University School of Law alumni
University of Pennsylvania Law School alumni
Pennsylvania lawyers
21st-century American writers
American male writers
Writers from Buffalo, New York